The 2003–04 Meistriliiga season was the 14th season of the Meistriliiga, the top level of ice hockey in Estonia. Five teams participated in the league, and HK Panter-Hansa Sport Tallinn won the championship.

Regular season

Playoffs

Semifinals 
 Tartu Välk 494 - PSK Narva 1:2 (3:0, 0:4, 1:3)
 HK Stars Tallinn - HC Panter-Hansa Sport Tallinn 3:4

3rd place 
 Tartu Välk 494 - HK Stars Tallinn 6:9

Final 
 HC Panter-Hansa Sport Tallinn - PSK Narva 2:1 (0:2, 6:3, 5:2)

External links
Season on hockeyarchives.info

Meistriliiga
Meist
Meistriliiga (ice hockey) seasons